Content and language integrated learning (CLIL) is an approach for learning content through an additional language (foreign or second), thus teaching both the subject and the language.

CLIL origin
The term CLIL was created in 1994 by  David Marsh as a methodology similar to but distinct from language immersion and content-based instruction. The idea of its proponents was to create an "umbrella term" which encompasses different forms of using language as the medium of instruction. The methodology has been applied in a business context in many countries and widely accepted as an effective approach. In Italy, for example, it is being used as an accelerated method to teach management concepts in English to business people. Among CLIL's proponents and practitioners there is Dr Maurizio Morselli, a Human Resources professional and Executive Coach, who believes that "this hybrid immersion approach produces a lot more immediate results and it appeals to self-motivated adult audiences who possess a basic knowledge and understanding of the target language".

CLIL and language immersion
CLIL is fundamentally based on methodological principles established by research on language immersion. This kind of approach has been identified as very important by the European Commission because: "It can provide effective opportunities for pupils to use their new language skills now, rather than learn them now for later use. It opens doors on languages for a broader range of learners, nurturing self-confidence in young learners and those who have not responded well to formal language instruction in general education. It provides exposure to the language without requiring extra time in the curriculum, which can be of particular interest in vocational settings." This approach involves learning subjects such as history, geography, managerial skills/concepts or others, through an additional language. It can be very successful in enhancing the learning of languages and other subjects, and helping children develop a positive attitude towards themselves as language learners. 

The European Commission has therefore decided to promote the training of teachers to "...enhancing the language competences in general, in order to promote the teaching of non-linguistic subjects in foreign languages".

CLIL objectives
CLIL objectives are varied, but among the most relevant ones the following can be pointed out (Coyle et al., 2010): To improve the educational system. To establish the necessary conditions that will allow students to achieve the appropriate level of academic performance in CLIL subjects. To improve students’ proficiency in both their mother tongue and the target language, attaching the same importance to each. To develop the intercultural understanding. To develop social and thinking skills.

CLIL advocates claim that this educational approach (Lorenzo et al., 2011): Improves L1 and L2 development. Prepares students for the globalized world. Increases students’ motivation to learn foreign languages. Promotes the learning of a more extensive and varied vocabulary. Enhances students’ confidence in the target language. Improves language competence in the target language, CLIL being more beneficial than traditional foreign language teaching courses. Helps develop intercultural competence.

CLIL in English as an international language
The integration of content and language learning in English as an international language (EIL) is found in approaches to bilingual education. These approaches include immersion, content-based instruction (CBI), content-based language teaching (CBLT), and the movement towards English medium instruction (EMI). All of these approaches raise a number of questions that a view of English as an international language has for content-integrated approaches (Thompson & McKinley, 2018).

Multiplicity of terms
The multiplicity of terms used to refer to instructional approaches for the integration of content and language learning (immersion, CBI, CBLT, CLIL, EMI) can be a source of confusion in EIL studies, although they all commonly share the purpose of additive bilingualism via a dual focus on content and language learning. Debate continues about the extent to which immersion, CBLT, CBI, and CLIL are different, similar, or the same. Some argue that CLIL represents an appropriate umbrella term that can be used to house various approaches towards content integration (e.g., immersion is a type of CLIL), where terms can be used interchangeably (e.g., CLIL and CBI are the same concept with a different name) (Cenoz et al., 2014). However, others argue that CLIL and CBI represent very different concepts, where CLIL represents the intersection between content and language from the content perspective (i.e., CLIL happens in content classes), while CBI is an attempt at responding to the content needs of learners in language classes (Dalton-Puffer et al., 2014). 

The similarities (and variability) between approaches lead to circular arguments about whether the key features of one approach are also shared by others (e.g., immersion and CLIL), and therefore they are indistinguishable. In some ways, this is an inevitable result of terms being used outside of academia, by educators applying ideas from one context to another, and the lines of demarcation become more unclear as approaches are transported to different countries and contextualized to meet different learning situations.

In EIL studies, different terms have been associated with different regions, such as CLIL, which is associated with Europe, and was “purposefully coined” by European educators and researchers attempting to influence language policy and ideology (Dalton-Puffer et al., 2014:214). CLIL represented a deliberate attempt to develop a European model for additive bilingual education. However, policy makers, educators, and researchers from international contexts have started to apply and develop CLIL approaches in distinctly non-European situations, and the term is now widely used within the wider international foreign language learning community.

See also
Language immersion
Bilingual education
Content-based instruction

References

External links
European commission CLIL site
ECLIL website

Bilingual education
Multilingualism
Education by subject

it:Immersione_linguistica#CLIL